WMYR (1410 AM) is a commercial radio station broadcasting a Catholic music/talk format, under the name Relevant Radio. Licensed to Fort Myers, Florida, United States, it serves the Lee County area. The station is owned by Relevant Radio, Inc.

WMYR broadcasts at 5,000 watts around the clock, although at night, the station uses a directional antenna to protect other stations on 1410 AM.  WMYR's programming can also be heard on an FM translator, 106.7 W294AN in Fort Myers Beach.  The studios and offices are on Collier Center Way in Naples and the 1410 transmitter is off Hanson Street in Fort Myers. The programming is also simulcasted in the Naples area on WCNZ AM 1660.

History

WMYR first signed on the air on November 11, 1952.  It spent most of the 1970s and early 80s as a Top 40 station.

On October 28, 2000, WMYR began airing the "Radio Disney" children's network. The format was dropped in February 2005.
In February 2009 WMYR, and its then simulcast sister station WCNZ changed from Catholic programming to the syndicated Scott Shannon "True Oldies Channel". In the fall of that same year, WMYR/WCNZ changed to the "Timeless Cool" format branded as "The Avenue."

On April 1, 2013, WMYR flipped to classic country, branding itself "Original Classic Country 1410." The web site said it was "The first station to bring Elvis to town, before he was a superstar. We are proud to bring back the great music of Waylon Jennings, Willie Nelson, Johnny Cash, Dolly Parton and Reba McEntire....along with new classic country artists like Alan Jackson, Toby Keith, Kenny Chesney and Tim McGraw."

When WMYR acquired its FM translator, it rebranded itself as "Twang 106.7" to reflect the translator's frequency.

Translator

References

External links
Relevant Radio

Radio stations established in 1998
Relevant Radio stations
1998 establishments in Florida
MYR